Qataghan Province (Persian: قطغن), was a province of Afghanistan which became defunct in 1963, when it was divided into the current Baghlan Province, Kunduz Province, and Takhar Province. 

From the 19th century to 1963 Qataghan and neighboring Badakhshan Province were united into a single province called Qataghan-Badakhshan Province. It was ruled by a single governor and was divided into two separate provinces in 1963. The capital of Qataghan Province was Baghlan, now a city in the north of Baghlan Province.

Etymology
Historian William Maley stated that the removal of the term "Qataghan" upon the division of the area was part of a deliberate process to remove ethnic identities from administrative names, drawing a comparison with the division and renaming of Hazarajat, homeland of the ethnic Hazaras.

Music
Qataghani style songs were born in Qataghan Province.

Population
Large population of Qataghani people are in Baghlan the capital of Qataghan province living into Darah Nikpai.

Economy
Mostly rice farming, since 2003 people starting grapes farming, there are also few gold mines in Baghlan.

Further reading
Burhanuddin Kushkaki. Rāhnamā-yi Qaṭaghan va Badakhshān. Kabul: Vizarat-i Ḥarbiyah, 1923.
“Kataghan” in Ludwig W. Adamec.  Historical and political gazetteer of Afghanistan  Vol. 1. Badakhshan Province and northeastern Afghanistan. Graz: Akad. Druck- und Verl.-Anst., 1972. pp. 94–96.

References

Former provinces of Afghanistan
History of Baghlan Province
History of Kunduz Province
History of Takhar Province
States and territories disestablished in 1963
1963 disestablishments in Asia